Wikibu.ch is a free software tool to assess the reliability of German Wikipedia articles. It was released by the University of Teacher Education Bern for use in schools to improve information literacy. Since 2014 it is available as open source.

See also

 WikiTrust
 Wiki-Watch
 Reliability of Wikipedia

Sources

External links
 Wikibu website

Wikipedia reliability